Partly Cloudy with Sunny Spells is a 2015 comedy film written and directed by Marco Pontecorvo and starring Luca Zingaretti, Pasquale Petrolo, Carolina Crescentini and John Turturro.

Plot 
On the border between Emilia-Romagna and the Marche, a business that produces sofas faces bankruptcy. The founders are two friends: Ermanno and Giacomo. Ermanno has a wife, Elena, and a son, Tito, 17, who lives immersed in the world of Japanese comics. Giacomo lives with his son Gabriele, an 18-year-old baseball fan. One night, Ermanno and Giacomo, digging a hole in the yard, discover something surprising: oil coming from the subsoil. This extraordinary event will create contradictions and conflicts, showing the worst side of the protagonists.

Cast  
 Luca Zingaretti as Giacomo
 Pasquale Petrolo as Ermanno (credited as Pasquale 'Lillo' Petrolo)
 Carolina Crescentini as Paola
 John Turturro as  	Ingegner Lombelli
 Lorenza Indovina as Elena
 Paola Lavini  as Marisa

See also 
 List of Italian films of 2015

References

External links 

2015 comedy films
Italian comedy films
2010s Italian films
2010s Italian-language films